The Haufe HA-S-2 Hobby is an American, high-wing, single seat glider that was designed by Bruno Haufe and Klaus Hill for amateur building and first flown in 1967.

Design and development
The HA-S-2 all-metal sailplane design was built as a follow-on to the previous Haufe-Hill collaboration, the Haufe HA-G-1 Buggie all-metal utility glider. The HA-S-2 took five years to design and build and first flew in Utah in 1967. The aircraft features a fixed monowheel landing gear, spoilers and is registered as an Experimental - amateur-built.

After the prototype HA-S-2 was finished a second example was completed from plans by Russell Worrell of Morgan, Utah in 1971. The second example was designated as the HA-S-3 Hobby and is also registered as an Experimental - amateur-built.

Variants
HA-S-2
Original model with a  wingspan. One built.
HA-S-3
Second model built with a  wider cockpit and a  wingspan. One built.

Specifications (HA-S-2)

See also

References

1960s United States sailplanes
Aircraft first flown in 1967